The Skyway Light is a German paramotor that was designed and produced by Skyway Products of Ettenheim for powered paragliding. Now out of production, when it was available the aircraft was supplied complete and ready-to-fly.

Design and development
The aircraft was designed to comply with the US FAR 103 Ultralight Vehicles rules as well as European regulations. It features a paraglider-style wing, single-place accommodation and a single  Skyway T170 engine in pusher configuration with a 2.8:1 ratio reduction drive and a  diameter three-bladed composite propeller. The aircraft is built from a combination of bolted aluminium and composite material, with the engine mount and fuel tank made from composites.

As is the case with all paramotors, take-off and landing is accomplished by foot. Inflight steering is accomplished via handles that actuate the canopy brakes, creating roll and yaw.

Specifications (Light)

References

 Light
2000s German ultralight aircraft
Single-engined pusher aircraft
Paramotors